Neoelmis is a genus of riffle beetles in the family Elmidae. There are more than 50 described species in Neoelmis.

Species
These 51 species belong to the genus Neoelmis:

 Neoelmis abdominalis Hinton, 1939
 Neoelmis alcine Hinton, 1972
 Neoelmis ampla Hinton, 1940
 Neoelmis anytis Hinton, 1972
 Neoelmis apicalis (Sharp, 1882)
 Neoelmis aragua Hinton, 1972
 Neoelmis argentinensis Manzo & Archangelsky, 2012
 Neoelmis aspera Hinton, 1940
 Neoelmis atys Hinton, 1972
 Neoelmis azteca Hinton, 1940
 Neoelmis caesa (Leconte, 1874)
 Neoelmis ceto Hinton, 1972
 Neoelmis crino Hinton, 1972
 Neoelmis fossa Hinton, 1940
 Neoelmis giga Hinton, 1939
 Neoelmis gracilis Musgrave, 1935
 Neoelmis grossa Hinton, 1939
 Neoelmis grossepunctata Delève, 1968
 Neoelmis guarani Shepard & Barr, 2016-22
 Neoelmis limosa (Grouvelle, 1908)
 Neoelmis lobata Hinton, 1939
 Neoelmis longula Hinton, 1936
 Neoelmis maculata Hinton, 1940
 Neoelmis mamorata Hinton, 1940
 Neoelmis marmorata Hinton, 1940
 Neoelmis maro Hinton, 1972
 Neoelmis mila Hinton, 1972
 Neoelmis minima (Darlington, 1927)
 Neoelmis morador Hinton, 1972
 Neoelmis mormo Hinton, 1972
 Neoelmis musgravei Hinton, 1940
 Neoelmis nana Hinton, 1940
 Neoelmis nelo Hinton, 1972
 Neoelmis nicon Hinton, 1972
 Neoelmis olenus Hinton, 1972
 Neoelmis opis Hinton, 1972
 Neoelmis plaumanni Hinton, 1940
 Neoelmis porrecta Delève, 1968
 Neoelmis prosternalis Hinton, 1939
 Neoelmis pusio Hinton, 1971
 Neoelmis reichardti Hinton, 1972
 Neoelmis resa Hinton, 1972
 Neoelmis saon Hinton, 1972
 Neoelmis scissicollis (Germain, 1892)
 Neoelmis simoni (Grouvelle, 1889)
 Neoelmis sketi Spangler, 1996
 Neoelmis sul Hinton, 1972
 Neoelmis thoracica (Grouvelle, 1896)
 Neoelmis thyas Hinton, 1972
 Neoelmis tibialis Delève, 1968
 Neoelmis tocuyito Hinton, 1972

References

Further reading

 
 
 
 
 

Elmidae
Articles created by Qbugbot